Down South may refer to:

 Down South (Doc Watson album), 1984
 Down South (Tom Petty song)
 Down South (film), a 1931 Toby the Pup cartoon
 Down South (Rhett Akins album), 2008
 Down South Hustlers: Bouncin' and Swingin', No Limit Records hip hop album

See also
 Southdown (disambiguation)
 South Down (disambiguation)